Razor Hill, also locally known as Che Kwu Shan, is a hill between Pik Uk, Ta Ku Ling, Tseung Kwan O, and Tai Po Tsai in the New Territories of Hong Kong.  It is 432 metres tall.
 The north and east mid slopes are skirted by Clear Water Bay Road.

See also 

 Geography of Hong Kong
 Clear Water Bay Road

References 

Mountains, peaks and hills of Hong Kong
Sai Kung District
Tai Po Tsai
Tseung Kwan O